Creatine methyl ester is the methyl ester derivative of the amino acid creatine. It can be prepared by the esterification of creatine with methanol.

See also
 Creatine ethyl ester

References

Guanidines
Methyl esters